The Sopron Mountains, occasionally also called the Ödenburg Mountains, is a low mountain range which forms the eastward extension of the Eastern Alps in Europe. It is part of the Alpokalja area of Hungary and also of the Burgenland. It is located close to the city of Sopron in western Hungary. Its highest point is the Brenntenriegel, at 606 metres above sea level.

See also 
 Geography of Hungary
 Rosalia Mountains
 Alpokalja

Mountain ranges of Hungary
Mountain ranges of Burgenland
Geography of Győr-Moson-Sopron County
Sopron
Mattersburg District
Oberpullendorf District
Eisenstadt-Umgebung District